A coup de main (plural: coups de main, French for blow with the hand) is a swift attack that relies on speed and surprise to accomplish its objectives in a single blow.

Definition 
The United States Department of Defense defines it as
"An offensive operation that capitalizes on surprise and simultaneous execution of supporting operations to achieve success in one swift stroke."

The term coup de main originally meant "by direct assault rather than by artillery". 

The first Allied airborne assault in World War II, during the invasion of Normandy, on Pegasus Bridge, is an example of a coup de main operation and is sometimes referred to as Operation Coup de Main though the actual code name for the British airborne attack was Operation Tonga.

Examples 
Emory Upton used the tactic for the Union Army during the Battle of Spotsylvania Courthouse.

During the Second Battle of Porto, Arthur Wellesley crossed the Douro in a coup de main attack upon the French forces of Marshal Soult.

See also
Battle of Fort Eben-Emael
Blitzkrieg
Coup d'état
Coup de grâce
Leadership spill (can be considered a political application of the concept)
Raid on Drvar
Siege
Tatsinskaya Raid

References

External links
 Flight to Pegasus

Assault tactics